Thotti Jaya is a 2005 Indian Tamil-language gangster drama film written and directed by Durai and produced by Kalaipuli Dhanu. The film stars Silambarasan and Gopika, while Pradeep Rawat  (in his Tamil debut) essays a supporting role. The soundtrack was composed by Harris Jayaraj with cinematography by R. D. Rajasekhar and Anthony.

The film released on 9 September 2005 and received positive response from both audience and critics and was a success at the box office.

Synopsis
Jayachandran is an orphan working in a hotel as a helper. It is assumed he gets his title name "Thotti Jaya", as he is found in a garbage bin as an infant. One day he beats and fends off a man who gets into a squabble with the hotel owner. The following night, the hotel owner rewards him with cash and dreads him the next morning. He realizes people only respect the people they fear, so he walks out from the hotel and reaches Chennai. He is spotted by Seena Thana and is hired as a henchman. In an incident, Thotti Jaya gets entangled in a political and police trap. To escape from the police, he slips to Calcutta and goes into hiding. Meanwhile, Brinda, a college girl from Kanyakumari, comes to Calcutta on a tour along with her friends. Pimps operating in the red light area of Calcutta take her away. Thotti Jaya accidentally meets Brinda when she tries to escape from the gang. He helps Brinda escape from the gang and takes her safely to Kanyakumari. On her way back home by train, Brinda starts admiring Thotti Jaya's niceties and gradually falls in love with him. When she expresses her desire, Thotti Jaya reciprocates her love, and both decide to enter into wedlock, but little does he know that Brinda is actually Seena Thana's daughter. Thotti Jaya takes Brinda away from her house and earns Seena Thana's wrath. Angered by this, Seena Thana summons his rowdy gangs and plots to bump off Thotti Jaya. How Thotti Jaya accomplishes his hopes of marrying Brinda is told in the remaining part of the story.

Cast

Silambarasan as Jayachandran a.k.a. Thotti Jaya
Gopika as Brinda
Pradeep Rawat as Seena Thana
G. M. Sundar as Santhanam
Ceylon Manohar as Nagu
Vincent Asokan as Muthu Ganesh
G. M. Kumar as Hotel owner
Cochin Haneefa
Vadivukkarasi
Rajendran
O. A. K. Sundar
R. D. Rajasekhar as a gangster (cameo appearance)
Linda Arsenio as a bar dancer (item number in the song "Yaari Singaari")

Production
After completing Vijay starrer Sachein, Kalaipuli Thanu approved the plotline of narrated by V. Z. Durai. Durai wanted Jeevan to play the lead role and also conducted test shoots with him, but the director was not impressed with his performance, so he replaced him with Silambarasan. Thanu was initially reluctant to have him as the lead actor since Thanu had misunderstandings with his father T. Rajender during the time of Cooliekkaran; he later made up his mind. Nayanthara was initially selected as the heroine, but she was replaced with Gopika. Thotti Gaja was an early title for the film before Thotti Jaya was confirmed. Silambarasan refused to dub for the film after shooting citing salary problems; the problem was resolved in Tamil Nadu Producers Council.

Legacy
Vijay Chandar's film Sangathamizhan, having Vijay Sethupathi in the lead role, had a scene in which comedian Soori was shown to imitate the gangster look of black along with Thotti Jaya songs played. The film's 15-year anniversary broke several records on Twitter for a sequel of Silambarasan's films and was noted as one of the most anticipated and wanted sequels, sharing the record with Vinnaithaandi Varuvaayaa.

Soundtrack
There are six songs composed by Harris Jayaraj, who collaborated with Durai and Silambarasan for the second time. Lyrics are written by Na. Muthukumar, Thamarai, Kabilan. Yuvan Shankar Raja, who was first signed as the music director, composed one song for the film, not included in the soundtrack and is credited in the title card. "Yaaridamum" was re-used from Harris's own song "Ye Chilipi" from Telugu film Gharshana, the remake of Kaakha Kaakha.

References

External links

2005 films
2000s Tamil-language films
Films set in Kolkata
Films shot in Kolkata
Indian gangster films
Films set in Chennai
Films shot in Chennai
Indian action thriller films
Films scored by Harris Jayaraj
Films directed by V. Z. Durai
2005 action thriller films